Max Marlin Fitzwater (born November 24, 1942) is an American writer-journalist who served as White House Press Secretary for six years under U.S. Presidents Ronald Reagan and George H. W. Bush, making him one of the longest-serving press secretaries in history. He is the only U.S. Press Secretary to be appointed by two different U.S. Presidents (Stephen Early and Pierre Salinger served as transition press secretaries for a few weeks and a few months, respectively).

Early life and education
Fitzwater was born in a Salina, Kansas hospital; his family's farm was in Dickinson County. He attended school in Abilene, Kansas from kindergarten to his graduation in 1960.  He received a degree in journalism from Kansas State University in 1965. Fitzwater became a member of Delta Tau Delta fraternity. While in school, he worked at newspapers (Lindsborg News Record, Abilene Reflector-Chronicle, Manhattan Mercury, and Topeka Capital Journal) in various Kansas communities before moving to Washington, D.C. upon graduation.

In 1966, he joined the District of Columbia Air National Guard and served in munitions maintenance as an airman third class in the 113th Tactical Fighter Wing at Andrews Air Force Base. He spent two years on active duty from 1968 to 1970 with service at Homestead Air Force Base, MacDill Air Force Base, Myrtle Beach Air Force Base.

Career in the government
In Washington, Fitzwater served at various federal agencies, including the Appalachian Regional Commission (1965–67), the U.S. Department of Transportation (1970–72), and the Environmental Protection Agency (1972–80). He was the spokesman who explained the toxic waste disposal problem in America and developed the public information activities related to disaster sites like Love Canal in New York State. Fitzwater was named Outstanding Civil Servant in government in 1980. He served as Deputy Assistant Secretary for Public Affairs at the Department of the Treasury from 1981 to 1982.

Fitzwater headed to the White House in 1983 and served until 1993:
He served in the Reagan White House as president's spokesman under the title Assistant to the President for Press Relations from 1987 to 1989, until Reagan left office in 1989. 
He served under George H.W. Bush as Assistant to the President and Press Secretary, later as communications director "Counselor to the President President Bush, until Bush left office in 1993.

Assistant to the President for Press Relations under Reagan
When James Brady was shot in the assassination attempt on President Reagan on March 30, 1981, Brady was unable to return to work, though he  retained the title of Press Secretary for the duration of Reagan's term.

Fitzwater served as the president's spokesman during this period, under the title of Assistant to the President for Press Relations. He served in this capacity until Reagan left office in 1989.

When Mikhail Gorbachev first visited the United States, in Reagan's first term, Fitzwater gave joint press briefings with his Soviet counterpart. Over 7,000 journalists attended them.

Press Secretary under George H.W. Bush
When George H. W. Bush took over as president in 1989, Fitzwater was again tapped to be the presidential spokesman, this time with the title of Assistant to the President and Press Secretary. Later in the administration, Fitzwater became communications director for about a year under the title Counselor to the President.

Later years
Fitzwater was awarded the Presidential Citizens Medal, the nation's second-highest civilian award, in 1992.

He worked on The West Wing as a writer-consultant for two television seasons.

In 2002, he founded the Marlin Fitzwater Center for Communication at Franklin Pierce University in Rindge, New Hampshire.

Personal life
Fitzwater married Melinda Andrews in 1999. He was previously married to Linda Kraus, with whom he has two children, Bradley and Courtney. He lives in  Deale, Maryland, a village on the Chesapeake Bay.

Fitzwater has been profiled numerous times on television and has appeared on Meet the Press, Face the Nation, Larry King Live, and nearly all national news broadcasts.

Works

Nonfiction
Fitzwater, Marlin. Calm Before The Storm: Desert Storm Diaries and Other Stories. Sea Hill Press, 2019.
Call the Briefing! is a best-selling memoir of ten years in the White House; called the textbook of White House press relations.
 Fitzwater, Marlin. Call the Briefing!: Bush and Reagan, Sam and Helen: A Decade with Presidents and the Press. Holbrook, MA: Adams Media, 1996. .

Fiction
Lawson, Robert with Marlin Fitzwater. Empires Fall.  A stage play about President George H.W. Bush and Gen. Secretary Mikhail Gorbachev. 2001.
 Fitzwater, Marlin. Esther's Pillow: A Novel PublicAffairs, 2001. 
 Fitzwater, Marlin. Death in the Polka Dot Shoes CCB Publishing; 1 edition (July 1, 2011) CCB Publishing; 1 edition (July 1, 2011)

References

Official Personnel Certificates Citing Presidential Appointments, 1983–93. Reagan Presidential Library, Simi Valley, CA; and Bush Presidential Library, College Station, TX.

External links
Marlin Fitzwater Center for Communication at Franklin Pierce University

1942 births
Living people
George H. W. Bush administration personnel
Kansas Republicans
Kansas State University alumni
Maryland Republicans
Military personnel from Kansas
People from Salina, Kansas
Presidential Citizens Medal recipients
Reagan administration personnel
United States Air Force airmen
Washington, D.C., Republicans
American political writers
White House Press Secretaries
District of Columbia National Guard personnel
Love Canal